Erasmus Perchinger, O.F.M. (died 26 September 1483) was a Roman Catholic prelate who served as Auxiliary Bishop of Freising (1482–1483).

Biography
Erasmus Perchinger was ordained a priest in the Order of Friars Minor. On 6 November 1482, he was appointed during the papacy of Pope Sixtus IV as Auxiliary Bishop of Freising and Titular Bishop of Saldae. On 18 November 1482, he was consecrated bishop by Stefan Teglatije, Archbishop of Bar, with Giuliano Maffei, Bishop of Bertinoro, serving as co-consecrator.  He served as Auxiliary Bishop of Freising until his death on 26 September 1483.

References 

15th-century Roman Catholic bishops in Bavaria
Bishops appointed by Pope Sixtus IV
1483 deaths